Frank H. Hanson was a member of the Wisconsin State Senate and the Wisconsin State Assembly.

Biography
Hanson was born on May 29, 1884 in Mauston, Wisconsin. He died on August 30, 1940, in Los Angeles, California where he had gone for his health.

Career
Hanson was elected to the Senate in 1914. Later, he was a member of the Assembly during the 1921 session. Additionally, he was District Attorney of Juneau County, Wisconsin from 1909 to 1914 and, Mayor of Mauston. City Attorney of Mauston in 1910, 1911 and 1916, as well as a member of the Republican State Central Committee.

References

People from Mauston, Wisconsin
Republican Party Wisconsin state senators
District attorneys in Wisconsin
Mayors of places in Wisconsin
Wisconsin city attorneys
1884 births
1940 deaths
20th-century American politicians
20th-century American lawyers
Republican Party members of the Wisconsin State Assembly